Ariquemes Futebol Clube, commonly referred to as Ariquemes, was a Brazilian football club based in Ariquemes, Rondônia. Their activities are currently closed due to financial difficulties. Ariquemes has last played in a professional match in June 2017.

History
The club was founded on 2 October 1981. Ariquemes won the Campeonato Rondoniense Second Division in 2007, beating Cruzeiro-RO 6–1 in the final game of the league, played on 12 October at Estádio Aluízio Ferreira. Ariquemes was runner-up in the 2010 edition of the Campeonato Rondoniense, when they were defeated in the final by Vilhena.

Achievements

 Campeonato Rondoniense Second Division:
 Winners (1): 2007

Stadium
Ariquemes Futebol Clube play their home games at Estádio Gentil Valério, nicknamed Valerião. The stadium has a maximum capacity of 5,000 people.

Notes

References

Defunct football clubs in Rondônia
Association football clubs established in 1996
Association football clubs disestablished in 2020
1996 establishments in Brazil
2020 disestablishments in Brazil